Piranha 3DD is a 2012 American 3D horror comedy film and sequel to the 2010 film Piranha 3D. Directed by John Gulager, it was written by Marcus Dunstan and Patrick Melton, and stars Danielle Panabaker, Matt Bush, David Koechner, Chris Zylka, Katrina Bowden, Gary Busey, Christopher Lloyd, and David Hasselhoff. After the events on Lake Victoria, the prehistoric school of bloodthirsty piranhas transforms into a newly opened water park.

Piranha 3DD was released in the United Kingdom on May 11, 2012, and in the United States on June 1, 2012, by Dimension Films. The film was panned by critics, who criticized its plot, characters, acting, the use of 3D and direction. The film grossed $8.5 million worldwide.

Plot
A year after the massacre in Lake Victoria, Arizona by piranhas, an eradication campaign has left the lake uninhabitable and the town has been largely abandoned. At Cross Lake, two farmers search the waters. Piranha eggs that have been laid inside a dead cow hatch, and the farmers are killed and eaten.

Maddy, a marine biology student, returns home for the summer to the water park she co-owns and is annoyed to find that the other owner, her stepfather Chet, plans to add an adult-themed section to the waterpark that involves nudity, which Maddy disapproves of. Later that night, Maddy's friend Shelby and her boyfriend Josh go skinny-dipping in the lake, where a piranha enters her vagina. Their friends Ashley and Travis begin to have sex in their van, but Ashley trips the handbrake, causing the van to roll into the lake. Handcuffed to the van during foreplay and unable to escape, Travis is devoured while Ashley, on the roof, calls for help. With no one around to rescue her, the van sinks into the lake and she is eaten by the piranhas.

Maddy consoles Shelby about their friends, before they are attacked by a swarm of piranhas. They manage to kill one and then Maddy, Kyle, and Barry take it to marine expert, Carl Goodman, to examine. He informs them that the piranhas may be moving between lakes and that they could evolve to become terrain-viable. The trio return to the lake, where they establish that the piranhas cannot make their way into the pipes connecting the lake and the water park. While Shelby and Josh are having sex, the piranha in Shelby's vagina bites Josh's penis forcing him to chop it off. Both are hospitalized but survive. Kyle is revealed to be corrupt and taking bribes from Chet, who is pumping water from an underground river into the water park. Chet orders Kyle to keep Maddy from finding out about his plans.

The adult water park opens, with David Hasselhoff in attendance as a celebrity guest. Among the guests are Deputy Fallon and former cameraman Andrew Cunningham, survivors of the previous year's piranha attacks, in which Fallon lost his legs. Fallon is there in hopes of overcoming his fear of the water. Maddy attempts to shut the waterpark down, but is stopped by Chet and Kyle. The piranhas then make their way into the area through the pipes and attack, killing many of the guests. Fallon uses a shotgun leg prosthesis to fight the piranhas, while Hasselhoff rescues a young boy named David. An uncaring Chet attempts to escape, but he is decapitated by a low-hanging flag.

Maddy instructs Barry to begin draining the pools while she attempts to save those still in the water. However, while she is rescuing people, she becomes caught in the suction and is dragged down to the bottom of the pool. After Kyle refuses to save her because of his fear of piranhas and despite being unable to swim, Barry leaps down and brings her to the surface, whereupon Maddy is revived. Thankful for saving her, she shares a kiss with Barry, who reveals to have a crush on her.

Another employee, Big Dave, pours chlorine into the pipes, followed by a lit joint. The resulting explosion kills most of the piranhas. Kyle is also killed by a falling trident. The celebrations are cut short when Maddy receives a phone call from Mr. Goodman, who informs them that the piranha left with him is evolving and, after escaping its tank, is now able to move on land, to which Maddy replies that she already knows. A lone piranha emerges from the pool and decapitates David while he tries to photograph it, and the film ends with the survivors taking pictures of David's corpse on their phones.

Cast

Production
Following the release of Piranha 3D, Josh Stolberg and Peter Goldfinger expressed interest in working on a third Piranha film, pitching their own ideas for a sequel. However, the duo was cut out from working on Piranha 3DD by Bob and Harvey Weinstein because their plans for the sequel were deemed too expensive, whereas the Weinsteins desired to make a low-budget sequel. Stolberg and Goldfinger ultimately got a co-producer credit in the film despite not working on it. However, an unused scene from their original Piranha 3D script, which had a car full of people sinking into Lake Havasu, which was cut for budgetary reasons, was repurposed and filmed for Piranha 3DD.

In October 2010, Dimension Films announced that they had secured John Gulager to direct the film, based on a script by Saw 3D scribes Patrick Melton and Marcus Dunstan. Filming was intended to take place between January 17 and February 18 in Baton Rouge, Louisiana, with a release date set for August 2011, but this became impractical because of cold weather and the requirement for most of the cast to be wearing little or no clothing. In March 2011, production on the film was delayed, and Joel Soisson was brought in to produce the film and rewrite the Dunstan-Melton script.

Principal photography began in Wilmington, North Carolina on April 25, 2011, with parts of filming occurring at Jungle Rapids water park and Shaw-Speaks community center. Soisson stated that in choosing a shooting location he was looking for an "iconic America town" that "could be anywhere". Soisson also indicated that tax rebates and the variety of geography in North Carolina had convinced them to choose the location over the alternative of Louisiana.

Filming was completed on May 27, 2011, after 33 days, with three weeks of filming occurring at the Jungle Rapids water park. The film was shot using 3D rigs, as opposed to converting the film to 3D in post-production. Piranha 3DD was cinematographer Alexandre Lehmann's first 3D film. Devin C. Lussier and Martin Bernfeld were hired to edit the film.

Release
The film was initially scheduled to be released on November 23, 2011, but a several month delay in the commencement of filming meant the November deadline could not be met. A month prior to the scheduled November release, the date was pushed back to an unspecified 2012 release. On March 3, 2012, it was announced that the film would be released simultaneously to theaters and through video on demand services. On March 14, it was announced that the film would be released on June 1, 2012, in the United States. The movie was released on May 11, 2012, in the UK. In the United States, it received a limited release, being shown in only 75 theaters.

Box office
The film made a small impact during its debut weekend of release in the United Kingdom. Its box receipts during its opening weekend were just £242,889, placing it at number 8. A lower-budget film that was not a new release, Salmon Fishing in the Yemen, reached #7, one place above Piranha 3DD. By the end of its limited run, it garnered a total UK box office of $688,269.

The film did not do well in North America either. It grossed $376,512 during its 3-week run. In total, Piranha 3DD did significantly better internationally, accumulating 95% of its $8,493,728 gross overseas, and narrowly scraping a profit.

Home media
The film was released in the United States in a 3D Blu-ray "combo pack", Blu-ray, and DVD, with all three editions containing digital copies, on September 4, 2012. In the United Kingdom, it was released on DVD and Blu-ray 3D (with a 2D Blu-ray version included) on September 3, 2012. The film was distributed earlier to rent via Redbox. The DVD is known as Piranha DD.

Reception
On Rotten Tomatoes, Piranha 3DD holds an approval rating of 13% based on 53 reviews, with an average rating of 3.30/10. The website's critical consensus states: "It strains to up the gore and self-awareness of its predecessor, and—despite some game celebrity cameos—the result is a dispiriting echo of 2010's horror-comedy." On Metacritic, it has a score of 24 out of 100 based on 13 reviews, indicating "generally unfavorable reviews".

Leslie Felperin of Variety gave the film a negative review, stating, "[The movie] ups the self-parody so much that it's practically a Wayans Brothers spoof, albeit with fewer jokes." Ben Rawson-Jones gave the film a scathing review, with a rating of 1/5 stars, and was highly critical of the use of 3D and direction, despite his enjoyment of the original film.

References

External links

 
 
 
 
 

2012 films
2012 comedy horror films
2010s sex comedy films
American 3D films
American comedy horror films
American natural horror films
American sex comedy films
American sequel films
American splatter films
2010s English-language films
Films about piranhas
Films directed by John Gulager
Films scored by Elia Cmíral
Films shot in North Carolina
Films set in 2011
Films set in water parks
Films with screenplays by Joel Soisson
Dimension Films films
Prehistoric life in popular culture
The Weinstein Company films
2010s American films